The following highways are numbered 829:

United States
 Georgia State Route 829 (former)
  Indiana State Road 829 (former)
  Louisiana Highway 829
  Nevada State Route 829
  Pennsylvania Route 829
  Puerto Rico Highway 829